is a Japanese football player. He plays for Vonds Ichihara.

Club statistics

References

External links

1986 births
Living people
Komazawa University alumni
Association football people from Saitama Prefecture
Japanese footballers
J2 League players
Mito HollyHock players
ReinMeer Aomori players
Vonds Ichihara players
Association football midfielders